A timeline of events and dates in 1402 in Italy:

 Battle of Casalecchio

Births

 Marco del Buono Giamberti (1402–1489) - Renaissance painter

Deaths

 Giangaleazzo Visconti (1351–1402), Duke of Milan

References

Italy
Italy
Years of the 15th century in Italy